Egidio is an Italian masculine given name. People with the name include:

Given name
 Egidio (saint) (circa 650–710), Christian hermit saint
 Egidio Colonna, Giles of Rome (circa 1243–1316), European intellectual, archbishop
 Egidio da Viterbo, Giles of Viterbo (1469?–1532), Italian theologian and humanist
 Egidio Ariosto (1911–1998), Italian politician 
 Egidio Calloni (born 1952), Italian former football striker
 Egidio Forcellini (1688–1768), Italian philologist
 Egidio Gennari (1876–1942), Italian politician
 Egidio Notaristefano (born 1966), Italian football player and manager
 Egídio Pereira Júnior (born 1986), Brazilian footballer
 Egidio Arévalo Rios (born 1982), Uruguayan football player
 Egidio Romualdo Duni (1708–1775), Italian composer
 Egidio Vagnozzi (1906–1980), Italian prelate of the Roman Catholic Church

Middle name
 Luis Egidio Meléndez (1716–1780), Spanish painter

See also
Giles (given name)

Italian masculine given names